Colac Bay / Ōraka is a small township situated on the bay of the same name facing Foveaux Strait, and located on the Southern Scenic Route, 10 minutes from Riverton, New Zealand. Surrounding areas include Longwood, Tihaka, Waipango, Round Hill, Wakapatu, Ruahine, Pahia and Orepuki.

The town hugs the bay, with sandy beaches, and has a popular surf spot known as Trees.  It is a beach break that breaks to the left and right.  The northern end of the bay is generally good for swimming. 
The town has a well appointed cafe, craft shop, pub, caravan park, community hall and Marae. 
The town also features a statue of a surfer riding a wave, which is popular with tourists.

The hills behind Colac are part of the Longwood Range, which were popular in early days for gold mining.  Further west shale was also mined for a short time.  In the gold mining days there was a significant Chinese village towards Orepuki called Canton.

Colac Bay Hill, Lake George, Howell's Hills and the Longwood Range make up the geographic landmarks. In some places Raratoka Island or Centre Island and Stewart Island/Rakiura can be seen by looking across Foveaux Strait.

Name
The word Colac is a contraction of the name of a Māori chief Korako who lived there, being a word that the European whalers pronounced like the English word "colic", hence Kolluck's and "Colac's Bay". With the passing of Section 269 and Schedule 96 of the Ngāi Tahu Claim Settlement Act 1998 Colac Bay is now officially known as Colac Bay / Ōraka.

Surfing
This coastline offers midtide surfing. The Southern swell breaks cleanly at the Eastern end of the Colac Bay Foreshore Road into both left and right hand breaks. This surf spot is known by the locals as "Trees".

Climate
Colac Bay's climate, which is similar to Invercargill's for its proximity, is oceanic (Cfb) in Köppen-Geiger climate classification system.

References

Bays of Southland, New Zealand
Southern Scenic Route
Populated places in Southland, New Zealand